Gibson Township may refer to the following places in the United States:

Gibson Township, Washington County, Indiana
Gibson Township, Michigan
Gibson Township, Mercer County, Ohio
Gibson Township, Cameron County, Pennsylvania
Gibson Township, Susquehanna County, Pennsylvania

Township name disambiguation pages